The Robert Audience Award is one of the external awards presented occasionally by the Danish Film Academy at the annual Robert Awards ceremony. The award was first given in 1999.

Honorees 
 1999: Flickering Lights
 2002: Shake It All About
 2003: Open Hearts
 2004: The Inheritance
 2005: Terkel in Trouble
 2009: 
 2010: 
 2011: Klown
 2012: Alle for en – as Yousee Publikumsprisen
 2013:
 Hvidsten gruppen – as YouBio Publikumsprisen – Drama (drama)
 Love Is All You Need – as YouBio Publikumsprisen – Komedie (comedy)
  – as YouBio Publikumsprisen – Børne- og Ungdomsfilm (children and teen)
 Forbrydelsen 3 – as YouBio Publikumsprisen – TV-serie (TV series)
 2014:
 Alle for to – as YouSee Publikumsprisen – Komedie (comedy)
 The Hunt – as YouSee Publikumsprisen – Drama (drama)
 2015: The Absent One (2014 film) – as Blockbuster Publikumsprisen

References

External links 
  

1999 establishments in Denmark
Audience awards
Awards established in 1999
Audience Award